Pathakchak is a village in Sikandra Block in the Jamui district of Bihar state, India. It forms a part of the Munger division.

References

Villages in Jamui district